USS Westover (ID-2867) was a cargo ship of the United States Navy that served during World War I and was sunk during her maiden voyage.

Construction and acquisition

Westover was laid down as the Design 1013 commercial cargo ship SS War Sun by J. F. Duthie and Company in Seattle, Washington, for the Cunard Line. During construction, she was taken over by the United States Emergency Fleet Corporation and renamed SS Westover. She was launched on 17 February 1918.

On 9 April 1918, while Westover was still fitting out, the U.S. Navy inspected her for possible use during World War I.  After her completion on 18 April 1918, she steamed to the United States East Coast and was transferred to the U.S. Navy in May 1918.  Assigned the naval registry identification number 2867, she was commissioned as USS Westover (ID-2867) at Newport News, Virginia, on 22 May 1918.

Navy career
Assigned to the Naval Overseas Transportation Service, Westover steamed to New York City, where she took on a capacity cargo of general United States Army supplies and got underway in convoy on 27 May 1918 bound for St. Nazaire, France. She developed engine trouble during the voyage and fell astern of the convoy.

Notes

References
 
 Online Library of Selected Images: Westover (American Freighter, 1918). Served as USS Westover (ID # 2867) in 1918
 NavSource Online: Section Patrol Craft Photo Archive Westover (ID 2867)

Design 1013 ships of the United States Navy
World War I cargo ships of the United States
Ships built by J. F. Duthie & Company
1918 ships
Ships sunk by German submarines in World War I
World War I shipwrecks in the Atlantic Ocean